Gentleman's Relish is a British commercial brand of anchovy paste. It is also known as Patum Peperium (meaning 'pepper paste' in Latin). Created in 1828 by an Englishman named John Osborn, it is a savoury paste with a salty and slightly fishy taste, and contains salted anchovies (minimum 60%), butter, herbs and spices. Today, the secret recipe is withheld from all but one employee at Elsenham Quality Foods in Elsenham, England, the licensed manufacturer.

Uses
Gentleman's Relish is traditionally eaten very thinly spread on slices of hot buttered white-bread toast, either on its own, or with cucumber or "mustard and cress" sprouts. It can also be added to minced meat for a different-tasting cottage pie or to the mixture for fish cakes, potato cakes and croquettes. Alternatively it can be melted into scrambled eggs or be used as a topping for jacket potatoes. It is an ingredient in the dish Scotch woodcock.

Variations
Elsenham Quality Foods also make a similarly packaged product, Poacher's Relish, which is made from smoked salmon, butter, spices and lemon zest. Both types of relish are sold in plastic containers (pictured), and in more expensive but reusable and decorative traditional ceramic pots. Since 2008 a third variation, Angler's Relish, made from smoked mackerel, salted butter, lemon juice, vinegar, spices and other ingredients was introduced in commemorative packaging to mark the 180th anniversary of John Osborn's original creation. Both are also usually eaten on toast or savoury biscuits, in common with the original recipe.

See also

 Garum
 List of brand name condiments
 Relish

References

External links
 The height of good paste The Telegraph, 28 December 2000.

Fish sauces
British condiments
Brand name condiments
Umami enhancers
1828 introductions
Anchovy dishes
Food paste